Savlon is a brand of antibacterial personal care products with the active ingredients of  cetrimide and chlorhexidine gluconate. Commonly sold as a cream, the product range also includes antiseptic sprays, sticking plasters and other antiseptic products.

History 
The product name is derived from the original Imperial Chemical Industries (ICI) manufacturing site name of the Avlon Works at Avonmouth near Bristol, UK on the Severn Estuary.

Savlon is sold in many countries, with different manufacturing and licensing agreements.

In 1992, Johnson & Johnson acquired the Savlon OTC brands from ICI. Since then, Johnson & Johnson manufactures and distributes Savlon products throughout Sub-Saharan Africa. In 2015, Johnson & Johnson sold Indian rights to the Savlon and Shower To Shower brands to ITC Limited.

Also in 1992, ICI sold its Bangladesh rights to Savlon to ICI Bangladesh Manufacturers Limited, now ACI Limited.

In June 2019, STADA Group of Germany acquired UK rights to Savlon from GlaxoSmithKline Consumer Products for its UK subsidiary Thornton & Ross.

Formulation 
The active ingredients in Savlon products are two antiseptics, cetrimide and chlorhexidine gluconate. These agents were discovered and first developed by Imperial Chemical Industries (ICI).

Savlon is commonly sold as an antiseptic liquid. It is used for cleansing and prevention of infection in skin lesions, including small cuts and blisters and minor burns, and is useful in first aid kits. Other items sold in the Savlon range include hygiene soap, antiseptic cream and healing gel. Savlon's antiseptic liquid comes in the SKU sizes of 75 ml, 125 ml, 250 ml, 500 ml, 750 ml and 2 L. In Australia, Savlon was acquired by Reckitt Benckiser after its takeover of Boots Healthcare (International) in late 2005.

References

Antiseptics
Soap brands
ITC Limited